Nicholas Peter Volpe (February 23, 1926 – August 21, 2021) was a Canadian football player who played for the Toronto Argonauts. He won the Grey Cup with the Argonauts in 1950, where he was named the game MVP. Volpe previously played football and attended the University of Toronto and East York Collegiate. He served as Consultant for Football Operations for the Argonauts. He was inducted into the University of Toronto Hall of Fame in 2012. Volpe died in August 2021 at the age of 95.

References

1926 births
2021 deaths
Toronto Argonauts players
University of Toronto alumni